Arturo Dresco (April 2, 1875 - July 21, 1961) was an Argentine sculptor.

1875 births
1961 deaths
20th-century Argentine sculptors
Male sculptors
20th-century Argentine male artists